In the early Middle Ages, a xenodochium or  (from Ancient Greek ,  or xenodocheion; place for strangers, inn, guesthouse) was either a hostel or hospital, usually specifically for foreigners or pilgrims, although the term could refer to charitable institutions in general. The xenodochium was a church institution that first appeared in the Byzantine world.

References

Further reading

Types of health care facilities
Buildings and structures by type
Types of hospitals